KLDJ (101.7 FM, "Kool 101.7") is a radio station in Duluth, Minnesota, owned by Townsquare Media, airing a classic hits music format.

The studios and offices are with its three other sister stations at 14 E. Central Entrance, on the west side of Duluth. These are KLDJ (Kool 101.7), KKCB (B105), KBMX (Mix 108), and WEBC (Northland Fan)

Previous logo

External links
KLDJ official website

Classic hits radio stations in the United States
Radio stations in Duluth, Minnesota
Radio stations in Superior, Wisconsin
Townsquare Media radio stations
Radio stations established in 1991
1991 establishments in Minnesota